The French second division Champions are the winners of the second highest league of football in France, Ligue 2.

The winner also earns promotion to the first division Ligue 1, as do the second-place and third-place finisher. Ligue 2 was inaugurated in the 1933–34 season under the authority of the French Football Federation. Following World War II, the league assumed its identity under the Ligue de Football Professionnel.

Ligue 2 champions
List of Ligue 2 winners and runners-up:

Notes:
In Bold are the teams who won the Championship play–offs.
In 1948–49, 1. FC Saarbrücken won the division under the name FC Sarrebruck, but as a German team, their points were ignored in the final standings.

Performances

Performances by club

Notes:
Bold indicates clubs currently playing in Ligue 2.
AS Béziers (2007) is the successor to AS Béziers Hérault.
AS Nancy Lorraine is not the successor to FC Nancy.
Toulouse FC is not the successor to Toulouse FC (1937).

References

External links

Ligue 2 records and statistics
Association football in France lists